Rebelles was a libertarian socialist periodical published in Canada. The magazine was started in 1993. It was headquartered in Montreal. It was published until 2001. Some of its members founded also another French language publication, Démanarchie.

References

1993 establishments in Quebec
1996 disestablishments in Quebec
Defunct political magazines published in Canada
French-language magazines published in Canada
Libertarian socialism
Magazines established in 1993
Magazines disestablished in 1996
Magazines published in Montreal
Socialist magazines